is a national university with headquarters in the city of Kashiwara, Osaka Prefecture, Japan and a branch campus in Tennōji-ku in the prefectural capital city of Osaka. It was established in 1949 by the merger of two predecessor institutions. Its short name is Daikyōdai. The university specializes in educating teachers. Unique among the national universities is its five-year program of nighttime study.

Sources
This article is based on the article 大阪教育大学 in the Japanese Wikipedia, retrieved on November 2, 2007.

References

External links
 University web site
 University web site

Education in Osaka
Japanese national universities
Universities and colleges in Osaka Prefecture
Kansai Collegiate American Football League
Teachers colleges in Japan
Kashiwara, Osaka